My Iron Lung is the third EP by the English rock band Radiohead, released on 26 September 1994 by Parlophone Records in the UK and by Capitol Records in the US. It was produced by Radiohead, John Leckie and Nigel Godrich. It marked Radiohead's first collaborations with Godrich and the artist Stanley Donwood, who have worked on every Radiohead release since. 

The EP consists of "My Iron Lung", from Radiohead's second album, The Bends (1995), plus several non-album tracks. Radiohead wrote "My Iron Lung" in response to the success of their debut single "Creep" (1992). Unsatisfied with the version they had recorded at RAK Studios in London, they used a performance recorded in May 1994 at the London Astoria.

My Iron Lung was released in advance of The Bends and received positive reviews. "My Iron Lung" was also released as a single, and reached number 24 on the UK Singles Chart.

Recording 
Radiohead recorded most of the songs on My Iron Lung at RAK Studios, London, during the sessions for their second album, The Bends (1995). The songwriter, Thom Yorke, said the EP was "just for fans", and described it as a collection of songs that did not fit on the album rather than outtakes: "We think they're good, otherwise we wouldn't have plugged them on." The EP also includes an acoustic version of Radiohead's debut single, "Creep" (1992), from a performance on KROQ-FM on July 13, 1993. 

My Iron Lung marked Radiohead's first collaboration with the cover artist Stanley Donwood. Donwood was not a fan of rock music, and said he took the work because he knew Yorke from their time as art students at the University of Exeter. The EP was also Radiohead's first collaboration with the producer Nigel Godrich, who was assisting producer John Leckie at RAK as a tape engineer. Donwood and Godrich have worked on every Radiohead release since.

"My Iron Lung" 
Only "My Iron Lung" was included on The Bends. According to the journalist Mac Randall, it transitions from a "jangly" opening hook to a "McCartney-esque verse melody" and "pulverising guitar explosions" in the bridge. Jonny Greenwood used a DigiTech Whammy pedal to pitch-shift his guitar by one octave, creating a "glitchy, lo-fi" sound. Ed O'Brien used an EBow, an electronic sustaining device, on his guitar to generate a drone. 

Radiohead wrote "My Iron Lung" in response to the request from their record label, EMI, to record a single to repeat the success of "Creep". The caustic lyrics use an iron lung as a metaphor for the way "Creep" had both sustained Radiohead and constrained them: "This is our new song / Just like the last one / A total waste of time / My iron lung". Yorke said in 1995: "People have defined our emotional range with that one song, 'Creep'. I saw reviews of 'My Iron Lung' that said it was just like 'Creep'. When you're up against things like that, it's like: 'Fuck you.' These people are never going to listen."

Radiohead recorded versions of "My Iron Lung" at RAK, but were not satisfied with the results. Instead, they used a performance recorded in May 1994 at the London Astoria, with Yorke's vocals replaced and the audience removed. The producer, John Leckie, said: "Considering it was recorded in the back of a truck outside the hall – not the best sound to get something from – we did quite well." The Astoria performance was included in the video Live at the Astoria, released in March 1995.

Release 
"My Iron Lung" was released as a single in the UK in September 26 in four versions, each with different track order. Two CD versions were released; one included the B-sides "The Trickster", "Punchdrunk Lovesick Singalong", and "Lozenge of Love", while the other included the B-sides "Lewis (Mistreated)", "Permanent Daylight", and "You Never Wash Up After Yourself". The release was an effort by EMI to encourage fans to buy multiple editions of the same single. My Iron Lung was later issued as an EP containing all the B-sides.

The "My Iron Lung" single reached number 24 on the UK Singles Chart. In the US, it topped the college radio charts, but sold only around 20,000 copies. Yorke and Greenwood expressed disappointment that Capitol, EMI's American subsidiary, had not promoted it more. The A&R VP Perry Watts-Russel said Capitol had not pursued radio play as it was "only meant to be a fan-based item" rather than a "proper first single" for The Bends. Randall argued later that "My Iron Lung" boosted Radiohead's artistic credibility, creating commercial opportunity for The Bends.

Critical reception 
According to Randall, "My Iron Lung" initially puzzled fans and critics, confounding expectations, but "makes much more sense" on The Bends. Though he felt Radiohead were right to omit the other tracks from The Bends, he identified a growing sophistication and diversity in their songwriting and felt that Radiohead were "gradually sounding more like themselves". He praised "The Trickster" and "Punchdrunk Lovesick Singalong" as the most developed B-sides, likening them to Sonic Youth.

The AllMusic critic Greg Prato praised the EP, writing: "Because of the tracks' consistency and sequencing, it plays like a real album rather than a collection of B-sides and outtakes thrown together haphazardly." He felt the acoustic version of "Creep", with a "surprisingly harsh and off-key middle section", was "the only weak spot". Entertainment.ie wrote: "While these off-cuts are inevitably more low-key and experimental than the classics we're all familiar with, the same spirit of anguish [of The Bends] and fragility is still thrillingly familiar." In a retrospective review, the Pitchfork critic Scott Plagenhoef wrote that My Iron Lung had seen Radiohead finding "new ways to pick apart and re-construct the typical alt-rock template" and "demonstrated a band whose collective heads seemed to crack open and spill out new ideas".

Reissues 
On 19 October, 2007, "My Iron Lung" was released as downloadable content for the music video game Rock Band. On 31 August, 2009, EMI reissued The Bends in a "Collector's Edition", including the My Iron Lung tracks. Radiohead had no input into the reissue and the music was not remastered. The EMI reissue was removed from streaming services after Radiohead's back catalogue was transferred to XL in 2016.

Track listing

Personnel
Adapted from the liner notes.

Radiohead
Thom Yorke
Jonny Greenwood
Ed O'Brien
Colin Greenwood
Philip Selway

Production
John Leckie – production and engineering on tracks 1–4 and 6
Nigel Godrich – engineering on tracks 1–4 and 6, production on track 5
Chris Brown – engineering on tracks 1–4 and 6
Guy Massey – assistance
Shelly Saunders – assistance
Jim Warren – mixing on track 5, recording on track 7

Artwork
 Stanley Donwood
 Thom Yorke

Charts

Weekly charts

Year-end charts

Certifications

References

External links 
 
 

1994 EPs
Radiohead EPs
Albums produced by John Leckie
Albums produced by Nigel Godrich
Capitol Records EPs
Parlophone EPs